Mario Renato Bartilotti Rodríguez (born June 11, 1976, in Villahermosa, Tabasco) is a Mexican actor.

Life

After enrolling in Televisa's Centro de Educación Artística (CEA), Renato Bartilotti began his career as an actor in the telenovela Mi Pequeña Traviesa, produced by Pedro Damián, in which he played a character nicknamed "El Sopas".

His first role was in Locura de Amor, alongside Osvaldo Benavides and Juan Soler; simultaneously joining the musical production for Primer Amor... A Mil Por Hora, telenovela for which he was able to insert three themes in its official soundtrack.

Renato Bartilotti has participated in many other telenovelas like Luis de Llano's Canción de Amor and Emilio Larrosa's Sonadoras. Later, he entered Toma Libre alongside Facundo, where he gave interviews in English. His latest appearance has been in Día de perros hosting as the leader of the show and becoming part of the creative team along with the producers. Later he teamed up with friend actor Kristoff Raczyñski (of the blockbuster film Matando Cabos) and together they created "Malogato Films" and developed the script called Y Tu Papá También an intelligent and funny parody script of films from all around the world (mostly Mexican). They produced it along with many other projects for "Telehit" (Latin American music-video channel). These projects were due to be released in 2007.

Mario Renato Bartilotti has recently participated in the new T.V. show Telenautas and the Mexican T.V. series Mujeres Asesinas.

External links

References

1976 births
Living people
Mexican male telenovela actors
Mexican male television actors
Mexican television presenters
People from Villahermosa